Alexandra-Therese Keining (born 1976) is a Swedish writer, film director, and screenwriter. She is known for directing LGBTQ-related films such as With Every Heartbeat and Girls Lost.

Early career 
Alexandra graduated with a film degree in Los Angeles. She made her debut in film with Hot Dog, released in 2003.

Film

With Every Heartbeat / Kiss Me 
In 2011, Alexandra began directing With Every Heartbeat. It revolves around Mia's affair with Frida, as their parents will soon be married.

Girls Lost 
Girls Lost was screened 2015 Toronto International Film Festival in Toronto. It was inspired by Virginia Woolf's 1928 novel Orlando: A Biography.

Awards 

 With Every Heartbeat won the "Breakthrough Award" at the 2011 AFI Festival. It was also accepted by Autostraddle as one of "8 Pretty Great Lesbian Movies You Haven't Seen Yet.".

References 

Swedish film directors
1976 births
Living people